Moshe Shaul (born 1929), also known as Mosheh Sha'ul, is a Sephardi Jews cultural researcher from Turkey who has worked on preserving the Ladino language.

Biography 
Shaul was born in Izmir, Turkey on May 24, 1929. He made aliyah to Israel in 1949. After migrating to Israel he began attending Hebrew University in 1954, attaining degrees in Sociology and Political Science in 1959. That same year he would join the Ladino broadcast of La Bos de Israel, a subsidiary of Kol Yisrael based in Jerusalem, and in 1977 he would take charge of it after the death of its director, Yitzhak Levy.

Shaul served as editor for Aki Yerushalayim during their first issue which was released in April 4, 1979 and continued this role for their 37 years of operation. While working there he actively worked towards standardizing the written language by creating a phonetic writing system which eventually became adopted around the world by Ladino writers. The orthography of his system was questioned due to the absence of written accents and a structure more similar to Turkish than Romance languages.

During this period Shaul also taught at Ben-Gurion University of the Negev (1980-1985) and served as the vice-presidency of the Ladino National Authority (NALC) in Israel from 1997-2015, where he trained new teachers for Judeo-Spanish and expanded the prevalence of the language. His work during this period is considered responsible for much of the diffusion of the Ladino language and culture in present day Israel. He also worked and boarded several other organizations, such as Amutat Sefarad, to promote and preserve Judeo-Spanish. Shaul has stated that the internet provides an opportunity to connect Judeo-Spanish speakers globally and create a living community to help promote the language.

In 2016 Shaul was appointed as a permanent member of the Royal Spanish Academy for Israel. Later in 2018 he was honored with Spain's Order of Civil Merit. He has also received a 'Life Award' from Autoridad Nasionala del Ladino for his contributions to the Ladino language.

Published works 

Ladino – Manual de estudio para principiantes (1990).

References 

1929 births
Smyrniote Jews
People from İzmir
Turkish emigrants to Israel
Journalists from Jerusalem
Israeli radio people
Hebrew University of Jerusalem alumni
Judaeo-Spanish-language writers
Order of Civil Merit members
Members of the Royal Spanish Academy
Living people